The list of shipwrecks in 1926 includes ships sunk, foundered, grounded, or otherwise lost during 1926.

January

1 January

2 January

4 January

5 January

6 January

7 January

8 January

9 January

11 January

12 January

13 January

15 January

16 January

17 January

18 January

19 January

20 January

23 January

25 January

26 January

27 January

28 January

29 January

30 January

Unknown January

February

1 February

2 February

3 February

4 February

5 February

6 February

7 February

8 February

9 February

10 February

11 February

12 February

13 February

14 February

15 February

16 February

17 February

19 February

20 February

21 February

24 February

26 February

27 February

28 February

March

2 March

3 March

5 March

6 March

7 March

10 March

11 March

12 March

13 March

14 March

16 March

17 March

18 March

22 March

26 March

27 March

April

1 April

2 April

3 April

6 April

8 April

9 April

12 April

14 April

15 April

16 April

18 April

20 April

22 April

25 April

26 April

27 April

30 April

May

11 May

13 May

18 May

19 May

20 May

23 May

25 May

26 May

29 May

June

1 June

3 June

6 June

7 June

8 June

10 June

11 June

13 June

14 June

15 June

16 June

17 June

18 June

20 June

24 June

27 June

30 June

July

1 July

2 July

7 July

8 July

9 July

10 July

12 July

14 July

15 July

16 July

17 July

18 July

20 July

21 July

22 July

23 July

26 July

27 July

30 July

Unknown date

August

2 August

4 August

5 August

6 August

7 August

9 August

10 August

13 August

14 August

15 August

16 August

18 August

19 August

20 August

25 August

26 August

27 August

28 August

29 August

30 August

September

1 September

2 September

3 September

4 September

7 September

8 September

9 September

10 September

11 September

14 September

15 September

16 September

17 September

20 September

22 September

23 September

24 September

25 September

26 September

27 September

28 September

29 September

Unknown date

October

3 October

6 October

8 October

9 October

10 October

11 October

13 October

14 October

16 October

18 October

21 October

22 October

23 October

24 October

25 October

26 October

27 October

28 October

29 October

30 October

31 October

November

1 November

2 November

3 November

4 November

6 November

7 November

9 November

10 November

11 November

12 November

13 November

14 November

15 November

16 November

17 November

18 November

19 November

20 November

21 November

25 November

26 November

27 November

28 November

29 November

30 November

December

1 December

2 December

3 December

4 December

5 December

6 December

7 December

8 December

9 December

10 December

11 December

12 December

13 December

14 December

15 December

17 December

18 December

22 December

24 December

26 December

27 December

28 December

31 December

Unknown date

References

1926
 
Ships